The 1990 NCAA Division I Men's Ice Hockey Tournament was the culmination of the 1989–90 NCAA Division I men's ice hockey season, the 43rd such tournament in NCAA history. It was held between March 16 and April 1, 1990, and concluded with Wisconsin defeating Colgate 7-3. All First Round and Quarterfinals matchups were held at home team venues with the 'Frozen Four' games being played at the Joe Louis Arena in Detroit, Michigan.

This was the first year in which the consolation game was not played since the tournament's premier in 1948.

Boston University's 30 goals scored during the tournament is the highest ever for a single team. The Terriers also played the most NCAA tournament games in one year (7).

Qualifying teams
The NCAA permitted 12 teams to qualify for the tournament and divided its qualifiers into two regions (East and West). Each of the tournament champions from the four Division I conferences (CCHA, ECAC, Hockey East and WCHA) received automatic invitations into the tournament with At-large bids making up the remaining 8 teams. The NCAA permitted one Independent team to participate in the tournament and placed it in the East Regional with the intent to insert an additional independent in the West Regional the following season. As a result, the two western conferences (CCHA and WCHA) would split four open spots as opposed to the East's three.

Format
The tournament featured four rounds of play. The three odd-number ranked teams from one region were placed into a bracket with the three even-number ranked teams of the other region. The teams were then seeded according to their ranking with the top two teams in each bracket receiving byes into the quarterfinals. In the first round the third and sixth seeds and the fourth and fifth seeds played best-of-three series to determine which school advanced to the Quarterfinals with the winners of the 4 vs. 5 series playing the first seed and the winner of the 3 vs. 6 series playing the second seed. In the Quarterfinals the matches were best-of-three series once more with the victors advancing to the National Semifinals. Beginning with the Semifinals all games were played at the Joe Louis Arena and all series became Single-game eliminations. The winning teams in the semifinals advanced to the National Championship Game.

Tournament Bracket
Note: * denotes overtime period(s)

First round

(E3) Maine vs. (W6) Bowling Green

(E4) Boston University vs. (W5) North Dakota

(W3) Lake Superior State vs. (E6) Alaska-Anchorage

(W4) Minnesota vs. (E5) Clarkson

Quarterfinals

(E1) Boston College vs. (W4) Minnesota

(E2) Colgate vs. (W3) Lake Superior State

(W1) Michigan State vs. (E4) Boston University

(W2) Wisconsin vs. (E3) Maine

Frozen Four

National Semifinal

(E1) Boston College vs. (W2) Wisconsin

(E2) Colgate vs. (E4) Boston University

National Championship

(W2) Wisconsin vs. (E2) Colgate

All-Tournament Team
G: Duane Derksen (Wisconsin)
D: Rob Andringa (Wisconsin)
D: Mark Osiecki (Wisconsin)
F: John Byce (Wisconsin)
F: Joel Gardner (Colgate)
F: Chris Tancill* (Wisconsin)
* Most Outstanding Player(s)

References

Tournament
NCAA Division I men's ice hockey tournament
NCAA Division I Men's Ice Hockey Tournament
NCAA Division I Men's Ice Hockey Tournament
NCAA Division I Men's Ice Hockey Tournament
NCAA Division I Men's Ice Hockey Tournament
NCAA Division I Men's Ice Hockey Tournament
NCAA Division I Men's Ice Hockey Tournament
NCAA Division I Men's Ice Hockey Tournament
NCAA Division I Men's Ice Hockey Tournament
NCAA Division I Men's Ice Hockey Tournament
NCAA Division I Men's Ice Hockey Tournament
1990s in Minneapolis
History of Madison, Wisconsin
Ice hockey in Boston
Ice hockey competitions in Detroit
Ice hockey competitions in Boston
Ice hockey competitions in Maine
Ice hockey competitions in Michigan
Ice hockey competitions in Minneapolis
Ice hockey competitions in New York (state)
Ice hockey competitions in Wisconsin
Sports in Madison, Wisconsin
Sports competitions in East Lansing, Michigan
Madison County, New York
Sports in Orono, Maine
Sault Ste. Marie, Michigan